The Yankton Carnegie Library is a historic building in Yankton, South Dakota. It was built as a Carnegie library in 1902–03, and is Neoclassical style in style.  It was built by German-born contractor August Goetz. It was a public library from 1903 to 1973.

It served as the town's library from 1903 to 1973, and later served as the Lewis and Clark Mental Health Center.

It has been listed on the National Register of Historic Places since August 7, 1979.

References

National Register of Historic Places in Yankton County, South Dakota
Library buildings completed in 1902
1902 establishments in South Dakota
Carnegie libraries in South Dakota
Neoclassical architecture in South Dakota